Brad Wright (born May 2, 1961) is a Canadian television producer and screenwriter. He is best known as the co-creator of the television series Stargate SG-1 (with Jonathan Glassner), Stargate Atlantis (with Robert C. Cooper) and Stargate Universe (also with Cooper) and as the creator of Travelers.

Before the inception of the Stargate franchise, he served as the co-executive producer and a writer of The Outer Limits. He has also written scripts for several other television series including Neon Rider,  The Adventures of the Black Stallion, The Odyssey, Highlander: The Series and Poltergeist: The Legacy.

Career 
Wright has appeared twice in Stargate SG-1, as a studio executive in the 100th episode, "Wormhole X-Treme!", and as a parody of Star Trek'''s Scotty in a fantasy sequence in the 200th episode, "200".

In April 2007, in recognition of his efforts to promote Canadian writing talent, and to recognize his efforts as the primary creative writing force on the Stargate shows, Wright was presented with the inaugural "Showrunner Award" at the Canadian Screenwriting Awards in Toronto. In July of the same year, he won the 2007 Constellation Award in the category Best Overall 2006 Science Fiction Film or Television Script for the episode of Stargate SG-1 entitled "200".

In late March 2009, Wright was nominated for a Nebula Award for "Best Script". The nomination was for the season 5 Stargate Atlantis episode "The Shrine".

Filmography
 Film 

 Television 
The numbers in directing and writing credits refer to the number of episodes.

References

External links
 Brad Wright  at the official Stargate'' website
 

1961 births
20th-century Canadian screenwriters
Canadian television producers
Living people
Stargate
Writers from Toronto
20th-century Canadian male writers
21st-century Canadian screenwriters
21st-century Canadian male writers
Canadian male screenwriters
Canadian male television writers